Heron Quays is a light metro station on the Docklands Light Railway (DLR) Bank to Lewisham Line in the Heron Quays area of Canary Wharf in East London. The station is situated on the Isle of Dogs and serves the southern part of the Canary Wharf office complex and is directly connected to the Jubilee Place underground shopping centre. The station is elevated and contained within one of the complex's office towers. It has an out of station interchange (OSI) for Canary Wharf Underground station on London Underground's Jubilee line. Through ticketing is allowed between both stations.

The station is in Travelcard Zone 2, and is on the Lewisham branch of the Docklands Light Railway, between Canary Wharf and South Quay.

History 
Originally open-air, the station was reconstructed in 2001-2002 (to fit inside a new high-rise development by Morgan Stanley and Lehman Brothers). Longer platforms were built to accommodate three-unit trains planned as part of the DLR Capacity Enhancement. Designed by Alsop Architects, the station re-opened on 18 December 2002.

Services and connections
The station is on the Docklands Light Railway Lewisham branch, between Canary Wharf and South Quay stations. The typical off-peak service, in trains per hour (tph), is:
12 tph to Bank
12 tph to Lewisham

London Buses routes 135, the D prefix route D3, D7 and night route N550 serve the station.

References

External links
 DLR Capacity Enhancement
 More photographs of Heron Quays station

Canary Wharf
Docklands Light Railway stations in the London Borough of Tower Hamlets
Railway stations in Great Britain opened in 1987